The Dominican Republic Shooting Federation was founded in 1963 and is the umbrella organization for sport shooting in the Dominican Republic, being a member of the international organization:

 International Shooting Sport Federation

References 

Shooting sports organizations
Sports governing bodies in the Dominican Republic